National Route 355 is a national highway of Japan connecting Katori, Chiba and Kasama, Ibaraki in Japan, with a total length of 73.8 km (45.86 mi).

References

National highways in Japan
Roads in Chiba Prefecture
Roads in Ibaraki Prefecture